Poorna Market is a famous market in Visakhapatnam, Andhra Pradesh, India. It is also called Sardar Valabai Patel Market.

History
Poorna Market started in 1935, the main market in the city at the time of the Second World War. Japanese aircraft attacked the market.

The market is well connected with all parts of the city.

References

Neighbourhoods in Visakhapatnam
Shopping districts and streets in India
Markets in India
Retail markets in India